Qingfangcheng station, is an underground metro station in Ningbo, Zhejiang, China. It is located at the intersection of Yage'er Avenue and Wancheng Road. Construction of the station started in December 2010 and opened to service on September 26, 2015.

Exits 
Qingfangcheng Station has 3 exits.

References 

Railway stations in Zhejiang
Railway stations in China opened in 2015
Ningbo Rail Transit stations